Ambrus is Hungarian name that may refer to
Given name
Ambrus Balogh (1915–1978), Hungarian sports shooter
Ambrus Lele (born 1958), Hungarian handball player
Ambrus Nagy (1927–1991), Hungarian fencer

Surname
 Attila Ambrus (born 1967), Hungarian bank robber
 Ferencz Ambruş (born 1930), Romanian boxer
Jan Ambrus (1899–1994), Slovak fighter pilot
Ludovic Ambruş (born 1946), Romanian wrestler
Mariann Ambrus (1956–2007), Hungarian rower
Miklós Ambrus (born 1933), Hungarian water polo player
 Victor Ambrus (born 1935), Hungarian illustrator
Vladimir Ambrus, Serbian rugby union player
 Zoltán Ambrus (1861–1932), Hungarian writer and translator

Hungarian masculine given names
Hungarian-language surnames